The 1993–94 Segunda División was the 45th season of the Mexican Segunda División. The season started on 16 July 1993 and concluded on 16 April 1994. It was won by Tampico Madero.

After completing this cycle, the Primera División 'A' was created with the aim of increasing interest in the lower divisions of Mexican football. As a result, the 1993–94 season represented the last season in which the Segunda División was the second hierarchical level of Mexican football, as of 1994–95 it became the third category in the Mexican league system.

Changes 
 UT Neza was promoted to Primera División.
 Pachuca was relegated from Primera División.
 Oaxaca, Tecomán and UAQ were promoted from Segunda División B.
 Colimense was promoted from Tercera División.
 Pioneros Cancún, Delfines Acapulco, Bachilleres and La Piedad were relegated from Segunda División.
 SUOO was bought by new owners, the team was relocated at Villahermosa and renamed as Tabasco.
 Linces Celaya sold its license to San Luis.

Teams

Group stage

Group 1

Group 2

Group 3

Group 4

Results

Championship play-offs

Play-offs

Final

Primera División 'A' creation 
In 1994, with the aim to create a premier league, the Mexican Football Federation upgraded the Segunda División (Second Division) to "Primera División 'A'" (First Division A) to bring closer the level of play in the two tiers, Primera and Primera A. The project was under the direction of José Antonio García Rodríguez, then president of the top-tier Primera Division. He envisioned the new division to be joined by the teams of the Segunda División with the best sports level and the highest quality facilities to better integrate in an eventual promotion to the Primera Division. 

12 Segunda División teams were promoted to Primera A. The placement of the clubs was done as follows:

References 

1993–94 in Mexican football
Segunda División de México seasons